The South American Under-20 Women's Football Championship (Spanish: Campeonato Sudamericano Sub-20 Femenino) is an international association football competition for women's national teams. It is held every two years for South American players under the age of 20 and serves as a qualification tournament for the FIFA U-20 Women's World Cup. In its inaugural year, 2004, it was played by U-19 players.

The last edition was held in 2022 in Chile. Brazil has won all the competitions with 9 titles in total.

For the 2002 and 2004 FIFA U-19 Women's World Championship, South America was given one qualification spot. In 2002 Brazil and Peru played a two legged play-off for one spot allocated to South America. Brazil won 12–0 on aggregate. Since 2006 South America has been given two spots for the now-renamed FIFA U-20 Women's World Cup. In this tournament, Brazil has reached the third-place match three times and Colombia reached the third-place match in 2010. Argentina has been eliminated from the group stage for all three of their appearances; Paraguay and Chile were eliminated from the group stage in their only appearance.

Results

Notes

Performances by countries

Participating nations
Legend
 – Champions
 – Runners-up
 – Third place
 – Fourth place
GS – Group stage
 — Hosts

Top scorers
The topscorers of the tournaments were:

FIFA World Cup qualification and results
QF = World Cup quarter-final
GS = World Cup group stage
Q = Qualified to World Cup

See also
 South American Under-17 Women's Football Championship

References

External links
 
 Championship results at the RSSSF

    
CONMEBOL competitions for women's national teams
Under-20 association football
Recurring sporting events established in 2004
South American youth sports competitions